9-Phenanthrol is an aromatic alcohol derived from phenanthrene, a tricyclic compound. It is a TRPM4 channel inhibitor. It can prevent the pancreas from secreting insulin when stimulated by glucose.

References

Hydroxyarenes
Phenanthrenoids